The 31st Young Artist Awards ceremony, presented by the Young Artist Association, honored excellence of young performers under the age of 21 in the fields of film, television, theatre and music for the year 2009, and took place on April 11, 2010 at the Beverly Garland Holiday Inn Hotel in North Hollywood, California.

Established in 1978 by long-standing Hollywood Foreign Press Association member Maureen Dragone, the Young Artist Association was the first organization to establish an awards ceremony specifically set to recognize and award the contributions of performers under the age of 21 in the fields of film, television, theater and music.

Categories
★ Bold indicates the winner in each category.

Best Performance in a Feature Film

Best Performance in a Feature Film - Leading Young Actor
★ Max Records - Where The Wild Things Are - Warner Brothers
Jake T. Austin - Hotel for Dogs - DreamWorks Paramount
Jimmy Bennett - Alabama Moon - Alabama Moon Entertainment
Taylor Lautner - The Twilight Saga: New Moon - Imprint Entertainment
Devon Bostick - Adoration - Ego Film Arts

Best Performance in a Feature Film - Leading Young Actress
★ Abigail Breslin - My Sister's Keeper - New Line Cinema
Emma Roberts - Hotel for Dogs - DreamWorks Paramount
Jolie Vanier - Shorts - Warner Brothers
Yara Shahidi - Imagine That - Paramount
Saoirse Ronan - The Lovely Bones - DreamWorks

Best Performance in a Feature Film - Supporting Young Actor
★ Ty Wood - The Haunting in Connecticut - Lionsgate
Brennan Bailey - My Sister's Keeper - New Line Cinema
Alex Ferris - The Time Traveler's Wife - Warner Brothers
Brandon Soo Hoo - G.I. Joe: The Rise of Cobra - Paramount
William Cuddy - Amelia - Fox Searchlight
Chandler Canterbury - Knowing - Summit Entertainment
Jake Cherry - Night at the Museum: Battle of the Smithsonian - Twentieth Century Fox
Jae Head - The Blind Side - Warner Brothers
Chase Ellison - Fireflies in the Garden - Kulture Machine
Jason Spevack - Sunshine Cleaning - Overture

Best Performance in a Feature Film - Supporting Young Actress
★ (tie) Sofia Vassilieva - My Sister's Keeper - New Line Cinema
★ (tie) Jessica Carlson - Cirque du Freak: The Vampire's Assistant - Universal
Chloë Grace Moretz - (500) Days of Summer - Fox Searchlight 
Evanna Lynch - Harry Potter and the Half-Blood Prince - Warner Brothers
Raini Rodriguez - Paul Blart: Mall Cop - Sony
Kiernan Shipka - Carriers - Paramount Vantage

Best Performance in a Feature Film - Young Ensemble Cast
★ Shorts - Warner BrothersJimmy Bennett, Jake Short, Devon Gearhart, Leo Howard, Jolie Vanier and Trevor GagnonAliens in the Attic - 20th Century Fox
Megan Parker, Henri Young, Regan Young, Austin Robert Butler and Carter Jenkins

Best Performance in an International Feature Film
Best Performance in an International Feature Film - Leading Young Performers
★ Leonard Proxauf & Leonie Benesch (Germany) - The White Ribbon - Sony Pictures ClassicsDenis Sukhomlinov (Russia) - Shenok (Puppy) - Universe
Nick Romeo Reimann (Germany) -  - Constantin Film
Tom Russell (Australia) - Last Ride - Madman Entertainment
Fouad Habash & Ibrahim Frege (Israel) - Ajami - Kino International

Best Performance in a Short Film
Best Performance in a Short Film - Young Actor
★ Joey Luthman - Save the Skeet
Ricardo Hoyos - The Armoire
Christopher Casa - The Catharsis of Foster Pensky
Tristan Price - Liberty Lane
Jack Weatherbe - Trolls
Michael William Arnold - Weird Al's Big Brain
Dawson Dunbar - Trolls
Joseph Castanon - Santa's Little Helper
Nathan Coenen - Tinglewood
Ryan Grantham - The Anachronism
Brandon Tyler Russell - The Exemption of Hunter Riley
Andy Scott Harris - Amory Blaine, Son of Beatrice

Best Performance in a Short Film - Young Actress
★ Madison Leisle - City of Lights
Caitlin EJ Meyer - I Love You Bernie Summersby
Megan McKinnon - The Tricks
Victoria Moroles - Innocent Eyes
Jolie Vanier - Strange Little Girl
Kiernan Shipka - Squeaky Clean
Sierra Pitkin - Trolls
Savannah McReynolds - The Christmas Valentine

Best Performance in a TV Movie, Miniseries or Special

Best Performance in a TV Movie, Miniseries or Special - Leading Young Actor
★ Joey Pollari - Skyrunners - Disney XD
Cainan Wiebe - Beyond Sherwood Forest - Syfy Channel
Brendan Meyer - Christmas in Canaan - Hallmark Channel
Jaishon Fisher - Gifted Hands: The Ben Carson Story - TNT
Jason Dolley - Hatching Pete - Disney Channel

Best Performance in a TV Movie, Miniseries or Special - Leading or Supporting Young Actress
★ Tori Barban - The Christmas Hope - Lifetime
Selena Gomez - Princess Protection Program - Disney Channel
Patricia Raven - Dear Harvard - New York TV Festival
Demi Lovato - Princess Protection Program - Disney Channel

Best Performance in a TV Movie, Miniseries or Special - Supporting Young Actor
★ Alex Ferris - Living Out Loud - Hallmark Channel
Gig Morton - Angel and the Badman - Hallmark Channel
Dante Brown - America - Lifetime
Patrick Casa - Amazing Stories: The Michael Jackson Story - Nippon TV Corporation
Matthew Knight - The Good Witch's Garden - Hallmark Channel

Best Performance in a TV Series

Best Performance in a TV Series (Comedy or Drama) - Leading Young Actor
★ Calum Worthy - Stormworld - Space
Jamie Johnston - Degrassi: The Next Generation - CTV
Andrew Jenkins - Stormworld - Space
Jake T. Austin - Wizards of Waverly Place - Disney Channel
Austin Robert Butler - Ruby & The Rockits - ABC Family
Nat Wolff - The Naked Brothers Band - Nickelodeon

Best Performance in a TV Series (Comedy or Drama) - Leading Young Actress
★ Ryan Newman - Zeke and Luther - Disney XD
Valentina Barron - Stormworld - Space
Cassandra Sawtell - Harper's Island - CBS
Miley Cyrus - Hannah Montana - Disney Channel
Miranda Cosgrove - iCarly - Nickelodeon

Best Performance in a TV Series (Comedy or Drama) - Supporting Young Actor
★ Ryan Malgarini - Gary Unmarried - CBS
Nathan Kress - iCarly - Nickelodeon
Kurt Doss - Ruby & The Rockits - ABC Family
Skyler Gisondo - The Bill Engvall Show - TBS
Vinicius Ricci - 9MM Sao Paulo - MundoFox
Trevor Gagnon - The New Adventures of Old Christine - CBS

Best Performance in a TV Series (Comedy or Drama) - Supporting Young Actress
★ Kathryn Newton - Gary Unmarried - CBS
Joey King - Anatopmy of Hope - HBO
Allisyn Ashley Arm - Sonny with a Chance - Disney Channel
Meaghan Jette Martin - 10 Things I Hate About You - ABC Family
Aislinn Paul - Degrassi: The Next Generation - CTV

Best Performance in a TV Series - Guest Starring Young Actor 14 and Over
★ Nate Hartley - Hannah Montana - Disney Channel
Calum Worthy - Flashpoint - CTV
Hunter Gomez - Ghost Whisperer - CBS
Colby Paul - The Mentalist - CBS
Jack Knight - Heartland - CBS
Jahmil French - Flashpoint - CTV
Brendan Meyer - The Assistants - The N
Nick Nervies - Monk - USA

Best Performance in a TV Series - Guest Starring Young Actor 13 and Under
★ Billy Unger - Mental - FOX
Austin MacDonald - Rick Mercer Report - CBS
Cainan Wiebe - Supernatural - CW
David Gore - Lie to Me - FOX
Sterling Beaumon - The Cleaner - A&E
Joey Luthman - iCarly - Nickelodeon
Aaron Refvem - Sons of Anarchy - FX Productions
Andy Scott Harris - House M.D - FOX
Scotty Noyd Jr. - CSI: Miami - CBS
Benjamin Stockham - Criminal Minds - CBS
Ryan Casa - The Colony - Discovery Channel

Best Performance in a TV Series - Guest Starring Young Actress
★ Emily Evan Rae - Private Practice - ABC
Erin Sanders - Mad Men - AMC
Danielle Chuchran - ER - NBC
Stefanie Scott - The New Adventures of Old Christine - CBS
Jordan Van Vranken - Criminal Minds - CBS
Savannah Lathem - Lost - ABC
Dalila Bela - Supernatural - CW
Mary Charles Jones - Grey's Anatomy - ABC
Bella Thorne - Mental - FOX
Laytrel McMullen - Degrassi: The Next Generation - CTV

Best Performance in a TV Series - Recurring Young Actor 14 and Over
★ Mick Hazen - As the World Turns - CBS
Devon Bostick - Being Erica - CBC
Nate Hartley - Zeke and Luther - Disney XD
A.J. Saudin - Degrassi: The Next Generation - CTV
J Brock Ciarlelli - The Middle - ABC
Daniel J. Gordon - Da Kink in My Hair - Global TV
Eli Goree - Soul - Vision TV

Best Performance in a TV Series - Recurring Young Actor 13 and Under
★ Colin Ford - Supernatural - CW
Austin Williams - One Life to Live - ABC
Aaron Refvem - General Hospital - ABC
Alex Cardillo - Durham County - ION
Connor Stanhope - Smallville - CW
Preston Bailey - Dexter - Showtime
Riley Thomas Stewart - 90210 - CW
Sterling Beaumon - Lost - ABC

Best Performance in a TV Series - Recurring Young Actress
★ Haley Pullos - General Hospital - ABC
Christina Robinson - Dexter - Showtime
Madison Leisle - Ghost Whisperer - CBS
Eden Sher - The Middle - ABC
Makenzie Vega - The Good Wife - CBS

Outstanding Young Ensemble Performers in a TV Series
★ Modern Family - ABCRico Rodriguez II, Nolan Gould and Ariel WinteriCarly - Nickelodeon
Miranda Cosgrove, Nathan Kress, Jennette McCurdy and Noah Munck
Stormworld - Space
Calum Worthy, Andrew Jenkins and Valentina Barron

Best Performance in a Voice-Over Role
Best Performance in a Voice-Over Role - Young Actor/Actress
★ Jordan Nagai - Up - Walt Disney PicturesFreddie Highmore - Astro Boy - Summit Entertainment
Cainan Wiebe - Dinosaur Train - PBS
Shemar Charles - Wibbly Pig - CBBC
Dakota Fanning - Coraline - Focus Features
Joey King - Ice Age: Dawn of the Dinosaurs - Blue Sky Studios/20th Century Fox

Best Performance in a DVD Film
Best Performance in a DVD Film - Young Actor/Actress
★ Matthew Knight - Gooby - ConeyBeare StoriesDanielle Chuchran - The Wild Stallion - Fill More Entertainment
Kelsey Edwards - Minor Details - MainStay Productions
Caitlin EJ Meyer - Minor Details - MainStay Productions
Connor Christopher Levins - Trick 'r Treat - Warner Bros. Pictures
Andrew Cottrill - Minor Details - MainStay Productions
Gig Morton - Santa Buddies - Walt Disney Home Entertainment

Best Performance in Live Theater
Best Performance in Live Theater - Young Actor/Actress
★ Sterling Beaumon - Big: the musical - El Centro Theater, HollywoodJolie Vanier - Oliver! - Red Carpet Theater Company, N. Hollywood
Alex Scolari - Big: the musical - El Centro Theater, Hollywood
Major Curda - The Little Mermaid - Lunt-Fontanne Theater, New York
Lauren Delfs - Blackbird - Victory Gardens Theater, Chicago
Kayley Stallings - Dr. Seuss' How the Grinch Stole Christmas! The Musical - Panatges Theater, Hollywood

Special awards
Outstanding Young International Vocalist
★ Yatharth (यथार्थ), Varanasi, India – Finalist on Sa Re Ga Ma Pa L'il Champs – Zee TVOutstanding Young International Instrumentalist
★ Sungha Jung (정성하), Chungju, South Korea – Acoustic Finger-Style Guitarist Jackie Coogan Award
Contribution to Youth Through Entertainment
★ The Beach Boys – Fifty Years of Outstanding MusicMichael Landon Award
For Humanitarian Service
★ George Clooney, Actor / Humanitarian – Co-founder: Not On Our Watch ProjectFormer Child Star - Life Achievement Award
★ Kathy Garver – "Cissy" in the CBS TV series Family Affair

Social Relations of Knowledge Institute Award
★ The Universe – The History ChannelOutstanding Contribution to Family Entertainment
★ Minor Details – Best Family Film★ Where the Wild Things Are
★ The 101 Dalmatians Musical
★ Up

References

External links
Official site

Young Artist Awards ceremonies
2009 film awards
2009 television awards
2010 in American cinema
2010 in American television
2010 in California